Napapon Sripratheep (born May 10, 1993) is a Thai professional footballer who plays as a midfielder for Thailand Amateur League club MH Nakhon Si.

Club career
Napapon Sripratheep is one of the 16 youths player who representing for Asia to join the program "Nike The Chance" has traveled to training with  FC Barcelona in 2012.

References

External links
 Source from Toyota Thai Premier League Official Website
 News from smmsport.com about Transfer of Napapon
 News from siamsport.co.th about Transfer of Napapon
 Napapon Scored for Krabi Against Songkhla United on August 2, 2015 (Source from Toyota Thai Premier League Official Website)
 Napapon Scored for Krabi Against Sukhothai on August 19, 2015 (Source from Toyota Thai Premier League Official Website)

1993 births
Living people
Napapon Sripratheep
Napapon Sripratheep
Association football midfielders
Napapon Sripratheep
Napapon Sripratheep
Napapon Sripratheep
Napapon Sripratheep
Napapon Sripratheep
Napapon Sripratheep
Napapon Sripratheep
Napapon Sripratheep
Napapon Sripratheep
Napapon Sripratheep
Nike Academy players